Dae Jang Geum (literally "The Great Jang-geum"), also known as Jewel in the Palace, is a 2003 South Korean historical drama television series directed by Lee Byung-hoon. It first aired on MBC from September 15, 2003 to March 23, 2004, where it was the top program with an average viewership rating of 45.8% and a peak of 57.1% (making it the 10th highest rated Korean drama of all time).

Starring Lee Young-ae in the title role, it tells the tale of an orphaned kitchen cook who went on to become the King's first female physician. In a time when women held little influence in society, young apprentice cook Jang-geum strives to learn the secrets of Korean cooking and medicine to cure the King of his various ailments. It is based on the true story of Jang-geum, the first female royal physician of the Joseon Dynasty. The main themes are her perseverance and the portrayal of traditional Korean culture, including Korean royal court cuisine and traditional medicine.

Synopsis
The story is set in Korea during the reigns of King Seongjong (1457–1494), King Yeonsan (1494–1506) and King Jungjong (1506–1544). The epilogue also spans through the reigns of King Injong (1544-1545) and King Myeongjong (1545-1567), with the last scene from March, 1550.

At the outset, King Seongjong has ordered the execution by poisoning of his wife, the Deposed Queen Yun, mother of the crown prince (future Yeonsan-gun). After carrying out the execution, one of the royal guards, Seo Cheon-soo, is haunted by it. On his way home, he suffers an accident and is rescued by a mysterious hermit with a cryptic message – that his life will revolve around three women: the first he has already met, but he killed her; another he will save, but will die because of him; and the third will kill him, but will go on to save many lives. It doesn't become clear until later in the story that the three women are the poisoned deposed queen, Park Myeong-yi (Seo's eventual wife) and Jang-geum (Seo's daughter). Haunted by the curse of the executed deposed queen and his prophesied fate at the hands of the third woman, he abandons his post and also becomes a hermit, refusing to take a wife. After many years, the former king dies and the Crown Prince ascends the throne. Park Myeong-yi is a palace girl and apprentice cook of the royal kitchen. She witnesses a fellow apprentice, a girl from the powerful Choi clan named Choi Seong-geum, slip poison into the Grand Royal Queen Dowager's food. Unaware that the senior kitchen officers are part of a conspiracy against the said Queen, Myeong-yi informs them. The officers, fearful that Myeong-yi might reveal their conspiracy, attempt to murder her by framing her committing adultery with a royal guard, then executing her with poison. Myeong-yi's best friend, Han Baek-young, manages to save her by secretly diluting the poison with an antidote and leaves the unconscious Myeong-yi a letter explaining what had happened. As Seo Cheon-soo wanders through the forest, he stumbles upon the half-conscious Myeong-yi, rescues her, and the two fall in love and marry. They end up living peacefully in a remote village as lower caste commoners and raise a clever daughter named Seo Jang-geum.

When Jang-geum is eight years old, King Yeongsan learns about the murder of his mother and vows revenge, seeking and killing people who were previously involved. Among them is Jang-geum's father, who so far managed to hide his identity. However, following an incident, Jang-geum accidentally causes him to be arrested. Her mother, rushing on the way to Hanyang to visit her husband, is spotted by the Choi family and eventually killed by an arrow. Jang-geum, now an orphan, is adopted by Kang Duk-gu and Na Ju-daek, a family making a living through selling wine. Two years later, Jang-geum enters the palace after King Jungjong ascends to the throne. She is committed to enter the middle kitchen (where her mother used to cook) to uncover a letter written by her mother. During this time, she meets Lady Han and they form a mother-daughter bond. The Right State Councillor Oh Gyeom-ho (the Choi clan's ally within the Royal Cabinet) frames Lady Han and Jang-geum as traitors in league with Jo Gwang-jo, the famous Joseon reformer. In an effort to save Jang-geum, Lady Han declares that she alone is guilty of treason. Nonetheless, both are judged guilty and sent to Jeju Island to work as government slaves. On the way to Jeju, Lady Han dies from her injuries. Lady Choi replaces her as head of the royal kitchen, while Jang-geum vows revenge. Official Min Jeong-ho, who's in love with Jang-geum, follows her to Jeju Island and offers to help her escape, but she refuses since doing so would mean never being able to return to the palace to not only clear Lady Han's name, but obtain justice for her mother's death. Min Jeong-ho declares he will wait for her and help her out throughout her stay in Jeju.

There, Jang-geum meets a woman named Jang-deok, a famous female doctor. Jang-deok's blunt and forthright manner at first offend her, but as time goes by, she begins to see that the female doctor is dedicated and caring. As the days go by, Jang-geum realizes that her only way back to the palace is to become a female physician, and begs Jang-deok to teach her medicine. Jang-geum's friend, Jeong Woon-baek, an eccentric royal physician, disapproves of her decision to pursue medicine in order to take revenge, but, in spite of this, she perseveres and earns herself a post as a female doctor-in-training at the palace. Here she encounters her former friend Choi Geum-young, who has been promoted to head lady of the kitchen, while the ruthlessly ambitious Lady Choi is now in charge of all the women working in the palace. Jang-geum's childhood best friend, Lee Yeun-seng, has caught the king's eye, and is now his concubine. Jang-geum endures many trials at the palace, but manages to accomplish great feats.

With Jang-geum's status rising, several events ensue that lead to an investigation of the Choi clan, resulting in the prosecution of Lady Choi, her elder brother and several high-ranking officials, including the Chief State Councillor. Everyone tries to escape, but only Lady Choi manages to evade the guards. Jang-geum finds her and asks if she is willing to sacrifice her niece, Geum-young, to the authorities while she herself escapes. Having abandoned her ethics and conscience for the sake of the Choi clan a long time ago, Lady Choi is unable to respond. Torn between self-preservation and guilt, she wanders the countryside hallucinating, ends up falling off a cliff on Dongin Mountain and dies. Choi Geum-young loses her position and is exiled along with the other officials.

Through her dedication, perseverance and medical skills, Jang-geum saves the royal family from re-occurring ill fortune. After giving birth to a stillborn child, Queen Munjeong remains ill. Jang-geum correctly identifies a second stillborn fetus in her womb and saves her life. She convinces the Dowager Queen to undergo medical treatment at the risk of being beheaded, and she also cures Grand Prince Gyeongwon of smallpox, which earns her the permanent gratitude of the Queen.

For her achievements King Jungjong makes Jang-geum a 6th rank official and appoints her to be his personal physician, the first woman to hold such a position. The court is in uproar and the state councillors unanimously oppose the appointment on the grounds that it violates the country's constitution. When the Dowager Queen humiliates herself to express her disapproval, the King revokes his decision. She urges the King to take Jang-geum as one of his concubines. Although he is in love with Jang-geum, he refrains from making her one of his concubines against her will. Jang-geum contains a small pox epidemic, and the King finally decrees her his personal physician. She is granted the honorific Dae (meaning "The Great"), as well as the position of a third rank official. The ministers and scholars of the court bitterly accept the decree, but demand the punishment of Min Jeong-ho for supporting Jang-geum's appointment. Seeing an opportunity to separate the lovers, the King agrees and Jeong-ho is sentenced to exile.

Eventually, the King's previous medical condition re-emerges. Jang-geum attempts to heal him using all the medical equipment and knowledge available at the time. The other doctors offer advice but nothing works. The king is dying. Jang-geum resorts to her last option—an experimental technique using newly "discovered" anesthesia and surgery. However, the King's body is considered sacred and the court unanimously opposes this new procedure, and the King decides not to allow the operation. Knowing Jang-geum's life will be in danger after his death, he grants her escape to be with Min Jeong-ho. The two of them live as fugitives and have a daughter, So-hoon.

Eight years later, King Jungjong is dead and Grand Prince Gyeongwon has been enthroned, while his mother Queen Munjeong is now both the Royal Queen Dowager and the Regent, wielding enormous power. When she learns that Jang-geum is still in the country, she invites her and Jeong-ho to return to the palace and be reinstated to their previous positions. Jang-geum and Jeong-ho joyfully return, but decide to live outside the palace for the sake of their family. Jang-geum leaves the palace not before seeing her friends from afar. As they return to their previous routine, Jang-geum comes across a pregnant woman, and successfully uses her surgical skills to deliver the woman's baby via Caesarean section. While she celebrates her success, Jeong-ho laments the repressive social climate of Korea, and its inability to accommodate a woman with ambitions.

Cast

Main characters

Lee Young-ae as Seo Jang-geum
 Jo Jung-eun as young Seo Jang-geum
An intelligent, beautiful, and extroverted woman whose outgoing nature and enthusiasm allow her to stand out from the crowd. Ever since her parents died during a political massacre, she has suffered many hardships and obstacles, especially in the palace, but she overcomes them with strong determination and perseverance.

Being strong-willed, Jang-geum strives to reach her goal regardless of the obstacles she is facing. It is with her extraordinary medical skills and knowledge, as well as her integrity and high ethics to only use her knowledge to heal and cure, that she becomes the first female physician to the king, and named Dae ("the Great") Jang-geum, becoming a third-ranked official, something unheard of at the time for a woman during the Joseon era.

 Ji Jin-hee as Min Jeong-ho
An educated, very intelligent and good-looking man, he is an outstanding scholar who combines both learning and the martial arts. Jeong-ho is a judge of the Hang Sung Boo, the ministry governing the affairs of the capital Hansung. Unaware of who he is, Jang-geum saves him upon being shot at. They then meet again when she approaches him to borrow books. They become romantically involved as he moves to Nae Geum Wee (the Royal Military Guard) as Jong Sa Gwan, a senior officer.

 Hong Ri-na as Choi Geum-young
 Lee Se-young as young Choi Geum-young
Ambitious and arrogant, Choi Geum-young starts her life in the palace as the niece of the influential Lady Choi, a former friend that becomes Jang-geum's lifelong rival. Although she is part of the Choi clan, she yearns to find her own way - never really accepting the Chois' way of doing things but unable to find her own independent identity. Her intelligence and talent often put her head-to-head with Jang-geum. Eventually Lady Choi's influence and her unreciprocated attraction to Min Jeong-ho prompt her to keep mostly to the Choi clan's ways.

 Im Ho as King Jungjong
The 11th king of the Joseon Dynasty. Before he ascends the throne, he was known as Prince Jinsung.

 Yang Mi-kyung as Han Baek-young/Lady Han
As one of the sanggungs working in the royal kitchen (soorakgan), she possesses a talent in culinary art and is able to identify the source of the ingredients in a dish. Best friend to Jang-geum's mother, she often misses and regrets not being able to save her friend. She is a rigorous, steadfast person who is not to be swayed from her purpose. Although obdurate in nature, she is actually very kind-hearted. Jang-geum's presence allows her to open up and she treats her as both a strict teacher and a kind mother figure.

 Kyeon Mi-ri as Choi Seong-geum/Lady Choi
Choi Pan-sul's younger sister and Geum-young's aunt. With her family hierarchy and bloodline, she is expected to be the successor of the soorakgans highest sanggung rank. She learned and was being taught about the delicacy of food from a young age. Arrogant and too proud, she has a fierce need to get what she wants and will stop at nothing until she gets what she wants. Sharp-minded and quick to act, she is always a step ahead of plotting against Jang-geum and Lady Han. She hasn't been nice to Jang-geum, Jang-geum's mother and Lady Han.

Supporting characters
Early life
 Park Chan-hwan as Seo Cheon-soo - Jang-geum's father and a former royal guard.
 Kim Hyeseon as Park Myeong-yi - Jang-geum's mother and a former kitchen lady.
 Im Hyun-sik as Kang Duk-gu - Ju-Daek's husband. Jang-geum's adoptive father and a palace chef.
 Geum Bo-ra as Na Ju-daek - Duk-gu's wife and Jang-geum's adoptive mother. She and Duk-Gu earn a living by selling wine.

Time as a palace chef
 Park Eun-hye as Lee Yeon-seng/Royal Noble Consort Suk-won of the Lee clan, the 8th wife of King Jungjong - Jang-Geum's best friend. Naive, cheerful and lovely, she got the King's attention when the King saw her crying and playing the King's dog. She became the King's concubine when she was pregnant the princess to King's child.
 Lee Ip-sae as Yoon Young-roh - niece of Yoon Mak-Gae and a loyal person to Choi family. Her loyalty to the Choi clan fruits, when she became the Attendant Lady of Lady Choi. Her life goes to jeopardy when Lady Choi asked her to hide while the Right State Councilor asked her to reveal the story between Lady Choi and Jang-Geum in exchange of Lady Choi's position.
 Kim So-yi as Min Gwi-yeol - the mentor of Chang-yi and second teacher to Seo Jang-geum and Lee Yeun-seng. She became the Attendant Lady of Suk-Won Lee after discovering that Lee Yeun-Seng is pregnant to the King's child. She also became the Head Kitchen Lady through competition.
 Yeo Woon-kay as Jung Mal-geum - Yeun-Seng's mentor and mother figure from Sauce Pantry. She became the Kitchen Head Lady and she loves singing and telling stories. She started the concept of competition in choosing the next Head Kitchen Lady.
 Park Jung-soo as Park Yong-shin - former Head Lady and Park Yeul-Yee's adoptive mother. After Lady Han and Jang Geum thrown to Jeju Island, She ousted in the palace after Lady Choi framed her for holding private parties.
 Choi Ja-hye as Chang-yi 
 Joo Da-young as young Chang-yi
Jang-Geum's and Yeun-Seng's friend who loves eating.
 Jo Gyeong-hwan as Oh Gyeom-ho - The Right State Councilor, ally of the Choi family in the Royal Cabinet. 
 Lee Hee-do as Choi Pan-sul - a businessman brother of Lady Choi and Geum-Young's uncle. 
 Na Seong-gyun as Yoon Mak-gae - Young-roh's uncle and a palace guard.
 Lee Hye-sang as Jo Bang
 Kim So-young / Chae So-young as young Jo Bang
The envious and bossy kitchen lady. She believes that since she is the oldest, everyone should follow and fear her. She envies Geum-Young because she always won the competition when they were younger. When they are adults, she envies Geum-Young (again) and Jang-Geum when they were chosen as apprentices of Lady Choi and Lady Han for the competition instead of her.
 Shin Gook as Eunuch Jang Geon - the head Eunuch. His loyalty to the King tested when Lady Choi discovered that the King's Medical Records (which is under the care of Eunuch's Department) was stolen by Jang Geum.

Royal Women
 Park Jeong-sook as Queen Munjeong - King Jungjong's 3rd wife, and Prince Gyeongwon's mother.
 Eom Yoo-shin as Queen Dowager Jasun - King Jungjong's mother and also a relative of Professor Lee.

Time as a medical woman
 Jeon In-taek as Doctor Jeong Yoon-soo - King's Physician. When he failed to know the cause and cure of the King's illness, he resigned from his position. His life goes to jeopardy because of his knowledge about the Choi's and  Right State Councilor's involvement in brimstone duck case.
 Maeng Sang-hoon as Professor Jeong Woon-baek - A physician/supervisor of Royal Garden. When he found out that Jang Geum will learn medicine to return in palace for revenge, He opposed it. He let Jang Geum to choose between medicine or revenge. After healed by Jang-Deok on his tumor, He returned to the palace as the Queen's physician.
 Kim Yeo-jin as Jang-deok - a caring and dedicated physician from Jeju and also Jang-Geum's mentor in medicine.
 Han Ji-min as Shin-bi - a kind and trustworthy friend to Jang-Geum. She entered in Royal Pharmacy with Jang-Geum.
 Lee Se-eun as Park Yeul-Yee - A palace nurse who offered herself to Choi clan to kill Jang-Geum to gain their trust. Unknown to the Choi's, Yeul-Yee is the adoptive daughter of the former Head Lady, Park Yong-Shin.
 Lee Seung-ah as Eun-Bi - A palace nurse who is assigned as in-charge of King's medicine until she became the nurse of the Queen Dowager Jasun.
 Park Eun-soo as Physician Shin Ik-Phil - a strict trainer of Jang-geum and Shin-bi when they enter the palace. He became strict to Jang-Geum not because he doesn't like her but he want Jang-Geum to be better. He became the Queen Dowager's physician, but she doesn't trust him at first because of the story about his patient in the past was died under his care. He later becomes the King's physician, when Jang-geum found the cause and cure for the King's illness.
 Yeom Hong as Bi Seon - the royal medical staff discipliner and also the assistant head of physician ladies.
 Professor Lee - another one of Jang-geum and Shin-bi's trainers. He calls physician trainees to become dancers when there is a special event. He is also Queen Dowager Jasun's relative.

Soundtrack
Theme song
The theme song, Onara is in Old Korean. This produced arguments about the lyrics and how they should be interpreted. As a result, different interpretations surfaced. Eventually the songwriter, Im Se-hyeon, revealed the lyrics.

The song is in the pansori style, a particular type of Korean music that emerged during the Joseon Dynasty and was very popular in the 19th century. It utilizes the vocals of one singer, a sorikkun, and one drummer, a gosu, to tell a themed story. The refrain ("He-iya di-iya he-iya naranino") is called chu-imsae and, in traditional pansori, it is supplied by the drummer to give rhythm to the song in addition to the beat. Chuimsae consists of meaningless vowel sounds or short words of encouragement. Chuimsae is analogous to scat singing in jazz nonsense syllables such as "La, la, la," or "Shoop, shoop ba doop" in English-language popular songs.

Korean version
The end of each episode of Dae Jang Geum features "Onara" sung by three Korean children, Kim Ji-hyeon, Baek Bo-hyeon, Kim Seul-gi, who were elementary students learning Korean classic music at the time. The Dae Jang Geum soundtrack album also features a slower version of the song sung by E Ahn (his real name is Lee Dong-hee), a Korean traditional music singer who graduated from the Korean classical music department at Seoul National University.

Foreign versions
"Onara" has several other versions that were used with Dae Jang Geum'''s release outside of Korea. "Hope" (希望 Hèimohng) was the version sung by Kelly Chen in Cantonese for the Hong Kong release. "Baby" (娃娃 Wáwá) was sung by Angela Chang in Mandarin Chinese for the Taiwan release. "Calling" (呼唤 Hūhuàn) sung by Tang Can, and "Hope" (希望 Xīwàng) sung by five winners of the Super Girl singing contest were among those used for the China release.

For the Philippine release, Faith Cuneta sang an entirely different song (in contrast with her earlier work for the Philippine broadcast of "Winter Sonata"), titled "Pangarap na Bituin" (a remake of the original sung by the singer's 2nd-degree aunt Sharon Cuneta as the theme song for her 1984 film "Bukas Luluhod Ang Mga Tala"). The Shamrock song "Alipin" is also used and Regine Velasquez also sings a version of this during the first re-run.

In Sri Lanka, the Sinhalese version was sung by Angeline Gunathilake and written by Athula Ransirilal; it was titled "Gaha kola mal gal gesee bala sitinawa" (The trees and flowers are looking at her). A Tamil version was also released with the title "Maramilay pukkal urindu parkinrana." Local musical instruments such as the raban were used in the recording, and both songs were very popular among children.

Original soundtrack
 고원 (高原)
 창룡 (蒼龍)
 하망연 (何茫然) Hamangyeon - feat. Safina
 오나라 II
 0815 (空八一五)
 연밥
 덕구
 Hamangyeon feat. Safina
 APNA
 다솜
 비 (悲)
 단가 (短歌)
 연도 (烟濤)
 오나라 I
 The Legend Becomes History
 자야오가 (子夜吳歌) Techno Ver.
 하망연 (何茫然) Hamangyeon-Instrumental

Awards
2003 MBC Drama Awards 
Grand Prize/Daesang - Lee Young-ae
Top Excellence Award, Actress - Lee Young-ae
Special Acting Award - Yang Mi-kyung
Special Acting Award - Lim Hyun-sik
Best Screenplay - Kim Young-hyun

2004 Baeksang Arts Awards
Best Director (TV) - Lee Byung-hoon
Most Popular Actress (TV) - Yang Mi-kyung

Cultural impact
As part of the Korean Wave of South Korean culture in East Asia, Dae Jang Geums immense popularity has had significant cultural impact.

Tourism
The Korea Tourism Organization promotes Dae Jang Geum-oriented tourism in East Asia and the United States and the main outdoor sets built by MBC for the shooting of the drama were purchased by the South Korean government. The Daejanggeum Theme Park was opened in Yongin, Gyeonggi Province in December 2004 at the site of these sets where much of the filming occurred.

Korean cuisineDae Jang Geum rekindled public interest in traditional Korean cuisine, both locally and abroad.

References in other shows
In an episode of King of the Hill, Kahn and Minh were watching Dae Jang Geum (which is dubbed in Laotian).

In episode 1 of Princess Hours, Chae-gyeong's family is watching episode 30 of Dae Jang Geum (Yeon-saeng being scolded for playing with the King's puppy).

In episode 32 of Love Truly, Yeo Bong-soon's mother (played by Geum Bo-ra) is watching Dae Jang Geum. Geum Bo-ra played Jang-geum's adoptive mother Na Joo-daek in Dae Jang-geum.

In episode 9 of Who Are You, there is a large Dae Jang Geum poster on the side of a building.

In episode 2 of Silence, a Taiwanese drama starring Park Eun-hye, Dae Jang Geum is mentioned as a famous Korean drama.

In episode 8 of Playful Kiss, Dae Jang Geum is mentioned despite the bad cooking skills of the main character.

In the final episode of the 2007 series, Yi San, a character played by Lee Ip-sae and her colleague have a moment of deja vu in the royal kitchen and come to believe that they worked there in their previous life. The same series takes place two centuries later in the Joseon Dynasty after Dae Jang Geum. Lee Ip-sae also starred in Dae Jang Geum and the other series is also produced by the same company and director.

In season 2, episode 9 of Learn Way, Im Ho reprised his role as King Jungjong to teach Mijoo about acting in historical dramas.

Musical theatre
In 2007, Dae Jang Geum was made into a stage musical titled "The Great Janggeum," staged at the Seoul Arts Center from May 26 to June 16. Following the same storyline, it condensed 54 episodes of the original TV drama into a two-and-a-half-hour-long musical which combined Western orchestral music with traditional Korean group dances. An eye-catching 400 different traditional Korean costumes enhanced the beauty and scale of the stage, coupled with beautifully detailed stage settings. Producer Han Jin-sup said the musical used music to substitute for visual effects, "rhythm and melodies that replace the enjoyment of watching beautiful sets of Korean food and also have lots of Korean colors and styles to amaze audiences". For example, when girls in the royal kitchen made dumplings to win the cooking competition, "plate dances" expressed the enthusiasm of the girls and the variety of dumplings. A total of 40 songs for the musical were arranged and written by Cho Sung-woo, a famous film composer. This was the first time that Cho had written vocal and background music for a musical, saying, "This is a great opportunity and an honor for musicians like me to have a chance to write songs for musical productions. I tried to make songs that have both the Korean and Western melodies." Asked about how to deliver a storyline that requires some knowledge of Korean history to foreign audiences, co-chairman of PMC Production Song Seung-hwan cited the familiarity of most Asian viewers with the drama's plot and said the musical will highlight "love," as a universal theme in the musical.

The musical was again staged at Sungjeon Hall in Gyeonghui Palace on September 5–30, 2008. Hosted by the Seoul Foundation for Arts and Culture and the Seoul City government, it was the foundation's idea to put the ancient palaces to added use beyond mere preservation and protection for viewing. Gyeonghui Palace was one of the "Five Grand Palaces" built in the Joseon Dynasty (1392-1897); about ten kings of the era stayed at the palace from King Injo to King Cheoljong. In the latter Joseon period, the palace served as a secondary palace ― a place where the king moves in times of emergency, as it was situated on the west side of Seoul. The palace was built incorporating the slanted geography of the surrounding mountain and boasts traditional beauty along with architecture rich with historical significance. The upgraded version of the musical highlighted the musical elements to better portray each character based on the more historical facts, reinterpreting the work through a new theme rather than the episodes. Keeping the colors, patterns, touches of the structures intact, the production used the natural backgrounds, traditional atmosphere and the outdoor characteristics. Audiences were surprised by the unconventional modern setting. While the story revolved around an historic palace from the Joseon Dynasty, the musical incorporated hip hop, fast tempos and a dynamic staging. The actors even broke into rap, creating an imaginative, gutsy and intense show.

Spin-off
The animated rendition of Dae Jang Geum, called Jang Geum's Dream is much the same story but focuses on Jang-geum in her younger years.

Sequel
In September 2012, MBC announced its plans to produce a sequel, Dae Jang Geum 2. In his opening speech at a cultural contents forum in Seoul in October 2013, MBC president Kim Jong-guk reaffirmed the project, saying, "We'll push for the production in the first half of 2015 after a year of pre-production."

In March 2014, writer Kim Young-hyun confirmed that the series would be aired in October 2014, and that lead actress Lee Young-ae who had previously turned down offers of a sequel since her semi-retirement from acting in 2006, is "positively considering" reprising her role. In Kim's synopsis, Jang-geum will reportedly lose her husband and her daughter will be kidnapped and taken to China, leaving Jang-geum to try to find her. The first half of the series will be about her journey to China, where the original series has a big following, and filming will take place there. But Jang-geum will return home without success, and resume her life by looking for a young successor to take under her tutelage. Jang-geum will choose to train the daughter of Geum-young, Jang-geum's rival from the first series.

International Broadcast
In Sri Lanka, the drama aired in Rupavahini dubbed in Sinhala from 6 November 2012 to 11 February 2013 at 6:30pm to 7:00pm. Under the title, සුජාතා දියණි - Sujatha Diyani meaning Brave Daughter. It was the first Korean drama to air in the country and sparked a massive popularity among the youth and children. Thus, following the success of the drama, other MBC Historical dramas began to air as well. Also it was dubbed in Tamil on the Channel, Nethra TV, under the title, சுஜாதா தியானி - Cujātā tiyāṉiSee also

History of Korea
Korean Wave
Jang GeumJang Geum's Dream - the animated television seriesDr. Quinn, Medicine Woman'' - American series about a female doctor

Notes

External links

 Dae Jang Geum official MBC website 
 Jewel in the Palace at MBC Global Media 
 Dae Jang Geum at Hunan TV 
 Dae Jang Geum at TVB 
 Dae Jang Geum at NHK 
  
  
 Dae Jang Geum at the Korea Tourism Organization 
 Dae Jang Geum Theme Park website 

2003 South Korean television series debuts
2004 South Korean television series endings
South Korean medical television series
Television series set in the Joseon dynasty
MBC TV television dramas
Korean-language television shows
South Korean historical television series
Television shows written by Kim Young-hyun